The Los Angeles Dodgers are a Major League Baseball team that plays in the National League Western Division. The Dodgers began play in 1884 as the Brooklyn Atlantics and have been known by seven nicknames since (including the Grays, Grooms, Superbas, and Robins), before adopting the Dodgers name for good in 1932. They played in Brooklyn, New York until their move to Los Angeles in 1958. During the team's existence, they have employed 32 different managers. The duties of the team manager include team strategy and leadership on and off the field.

Table key

Managers

Footnotes
 A running total of the number of Dodgers managers. Thus, any manager who has two or more separate terms is counted only once.

References
General references

Inline citations

Los Angeles Dodgers
Managers